The 2012 Scandinavian Touring Car Championship season was the second Scandinavian Touring Car Championship season. The season started at Mantorp Park on 5 May and ended on 22 September at the brand new track at Solvalla in Stockholm. It was the first season which included cars built to the Next Generation Touring Car specification.

Teams and drivers
(Note: drivers with car numbers 88–99 are eligible for the Semcon cup). All teams were Swedish-registered.

Notes:
 — Volkswagen Team Biogas and IPS Team Biogas are using Biogas (CNG) 2.0-litre Turbo engines in their four Volkswagen Sciroccos.

Race calendar
The provisional calendar was announced by the championship organisers on 15 October 2011. 2012 will see the inclusion of the brand new Sovalla track on the streets of Stockholm and a track at the Östersund airport.

Championship standings

Drivers Championships

† — Drivers did not finish the race, but were classified as they completed over 90% of the race distance.

References

External links

 Official website of the Scandinavian Touring Car Championship

Scandinavian Touring Car
Scandinavian Touring Car